Yul or YUL may refer to:

Yul (name), including a list of people with the name
YUL, the IATA airport code of Montréal–Pierre Elliott Trudeau International Airport
YUL Condos, a residential high-rise in downtown Montreal
Yul, a fictional kingdom from the Korean novel Hong Gildong jeon
Yul Kwon, an American television host and former Survivor player
Yuen Long station, Hong Kong, MTR station code

See also
Yule (disambiguation)